The Seven Wise Masters (also called the Seven Sages or Seven Wise Men) is a cycle of stories of Sanskrit, Persian or Hebrew origins.

Story and plot
The Sultan sends his son, the young Prince, to be educated away from the court in the seven liberal arts by Seven Wise Masters. On his return to court, his stepmother, the empress, attempts to seduce him. To avert danger he is bound over to a week's silence by Sindibad, leader of the Seven Wise Masters. During this time, the empress accuses him to her husband, and seeks to bring about his death by seven stories which she relates to the emperor; but her narrative is each time confuted by the Seven Wise Masters led by Sindibad. Finally the prince's lips are unsealed, the truth exposed, and the wicked empress is executed.

The frame narrative served as the flexible way to transmit tales to other listeners.

Origins
The cycle of stories, which appears in many European languages, is of Eastern origin. An analogous collection occurs in Sanskrit, attributed to the Indian philosopher Syntipas in the first century BC, though the Indian original is unknown. Other suggested origins are Persian (since the earliest surviving texts are in Persian) and Hebrew (a culture with similar tales, such as that of the biblical Joseph).

Later history
Hundreds of surviving European texts are known. These normally contain fifteen tales, one for each sage, seven from the stepmother, and one from the prince; though the framework is preserved, only four of the commonest European tales are also found in the Eastern version.

Hermann Österley, Strassburg, 1873). Another French version, was based on a different Latin original.

The German, English, French and Spanish chapbooks of the cycle are generally based on a Latin original differing from these. Three metrical romances probably based on the French, and dating from the 14th century, exist in English. The most important of these is The Sevyn Sages by John Rolland of Dalkeith edited for the Bannatyne Club (Edinburgh, 1837).

Literary legacy
The collection later supplied tales that circulated in both oral and written traditions. Giovanni Boccaccio used many of them for his famous work, the Decameron.

The Latin romance was frequently printed in the 15th century, and Wynkyn de Worde printed an English version about 1515. See:
Gaston Paris,  (Paris, Société des anciens textes français, 1876)
Georg Büchner,  (Erlangen, 1889)
Killis Campbell, A Study of the Romance of the Seven Sages with special reference to the middle English versions (Baltimore, 1898)
Domenico Comparetti, Researches respecting the Book of Sindibdd (Folk-Lore Soc., 1882).

The Seven Sages Society, founded in 1975, maintains a perpetual scholarly bibliography, with annual updates in its on-line and printed (free of charge) newsletter.

Stories
The tale collection has been thought to contain the origins of the Aarne–Thompson–Uther tale type ATU 671, "The Three Languages". The story tells of a commoner boy who can understand the language of animals, which converse among themselves that the boy will lord over their mother and father in the future. His parents expel him for such affront. After a series of adventures, the boy becomes a king or pope and returns to his family's house. His parents serve him with a water and a towel and he reveals his identity.

See also
Tutinama

References

Sources

Irwin, Bonnie D. "The Seven Sages," in Madieval Folklore: A Guide to Myths, Legends, Beliefs, and Customs, Carl Lindahl, John McNamara and John Lindow, eds. Oxford University Press, 2002.

 Runte, Hans R., J. Keith Wikeley and Anthony J. Farrell, The Seven Sages of Rome and the Book of Sindbad: An Analytical Bibliography, New York: Garland Publishing, Inc., 1984 (Garland Reference Library of the Humanities).

Further reading
 Gadsden, Carys. "Chwedleu Seith Doethon Rufein, the Middle Welsh Les Sept Sages De Rome: An Inadequate Rendering or a New Perspective on This Internationally Popular Tale?" Narrative Culture 7, no. 2 (2020): 198-215.  doi:10.13110/narrcult.7.2.0198.

Medieval literature
Indian folklore
Indian fairy tales
Sanskrit literature
Indian literature
Indian legends
ATU 650-699